Hirkani is a 2019 Indian Marathi language historical drama film directed by Prasad Oak and produced by Falguni Patel under the banner of Irada Entertainment with Lawrence D'Souza as co-producer. The film is bankrolled by Rajesh Mapuskar. The film stars Sonalee Kulkarni in titular role of 'Hirkani', a brave woman and an amazing mother who lived near the Raigad Fort in Maharashtra during the regime Chhatrapati Shivaji Maharaj. The film also features Chinmay Mandlekar in a cameo role. The film is second directorial of Prasad Oak. The music of the film is composed by Amitraj and the soundtrack includes a devotional song by Asha Bhosle.

The filming of the historical drama began on 2 June 2019. It was theatrically released on 24 October 2019. Hirkani grossed around ₹12 crore at Box office.

Plot
Hirkani was living near Raigad fort. The fort was captured by Chhatrapati Shivaji Maharaj and made its capital in 1674. The fort is situated in the hills of the Western Ghats and is surrounded on all sides by fortified ramparts.

The village at the foot of the hill was a source of daily trade for the citizens living in the fort premises.

The villagers set up a hill near the gate of the fort, which was opened in the morning to sell their wares, and it was closed every evening, and the gates were not to be opened to anyone until the next morning.

Like everyone else, Hirkani used to stand in line at the main entrance every morning. One such day, while preparing to go to the fort, Hirkani was late because of her child. Hirkani was going to the market every day and she was selling milk to her regular customers. Unfortunately, it was too late for her to reach the gate in the evening and the gate was already closed at sunset by Mawla's charge.

She had left her son at home, Hirkani did not try to plead with Mawla, who did not think, and all the value of Chhatrapati's order would have to be weighed. When the baby thought she was alone and hungry, Hirkani did something she had never done before.

She descended the fort and while descending the fort she got itchy and got injured from a rocky outcrop.

The next day Hirkani was at the gate of the fort for the daily market. Mavala was shocked to see the gatekeeper entering the door. He immediately took her to Chhatrapati Shivaji Maharaj for allegedly breaking the rules. Chhatrapati Shivaji Maharaj heard her story and then saw scratches on her hands and face.

Instead of punishing Hirkani, he praised her courage and immediately ordered a wall to be built on the unsafe vertical drop and named it after her.

Cast 
 Sonalee Kulkarni as Hirkani 
 Makrand Deshpande as Bahirji Naik
 Ameet Khedekar as Jiva
 Prasad Oak as Chhatrapati Shivaji Maharaj
 Jitendra Joshi as Fakir
 Vimal Mhatre as Hirkani's sasu
 Aishwarya Rajesh as Chandra
 Hemant Dhome as Shahir
 Sakshi Gandhi as Saibai
 Suhas Joshi as Jijabai
 Mehul as Vaal
 Chinmay Mandlekar
 Kshitee Jog
 Siddharth Chandekar
 Priyadarshan Jadhav
 Rajshree Thakur
 Pushkar Shrotri

Production
The film presents the historical story of a mother, from the period of Chhatrapati Shivaji Maharaj, who scaled down the steep edges of the Raigad fort to reach out to her baby, not caring for her own life. Her courage was honoured with the title 'Hirkani'. The director Prasad Oak and writer Chinmay Mandlekar cast Sonalee Kulkarni in titular role of Hirkani. The principal photography began on 30 April 2019.

Release
The film was theatrically released on 24 October 2019.

Soundtrack

The songs for the film are composed by  Amitraj and lyrics by Kavibhushan, Sandeep Khare and Sanjay Krishnaji Patil.

References

External links 
 

2019 films
Indian historical drama films
2010s historical drama films
2010s Marathi-language films
Films set in the Maratha Empire
Films about women in India
2019 drama films